Cypho purpurascens. the oblique-lined dottyback or the lavender dottyback is a species of ray finned fish from the family Pseudochromidae which occurs in the western Pacific. It occasionally makes its way into the aquarium trade. These fish live in pairs, or are solitary, in or in the vicinity of crevices in the reef and holes located in tidal pools, lagoons and on the reef slopes.

See also 
 List of marine aquarium fish species

References

External links
 

Pseudochrominae